WDJA (1420 AM) is a radio station broadcasting a Spanish Christian format. Licensed to Delray Beach, Florida, United States, the station is currently owned by Professional Broadcasting, LLC.

History

The station went on the air as WDBF in the 70s and broadcast a Big band format under the ownership of bandleader Vic Knight.  On April 3, 2001, the station changed its call sign to WPBI. On April 23, 2003, the calls were changed to WFFL but were quickly changed to WFTL one week later. The following week (May 7, 2003) the call sign was again changed to the current WDJA. From  On February 3, 2009, the World Ethnic format was dropped for a News/talk format.

On January 1, 2012, WDJA flipped to a Spanish Christian format branded as Radio Universo.

References

External links

 South Florida Radio Pages web site

News and talk radio stations in the United States
DJA
Radio stations established in 1978
1978 establishments in Florida